Mattias Falck (né Karlsson) (born 7 September 1991) is a Swedish table tennis player.

Career
He competed at the 2016 Summer Olympics as part of the Swedish team in the men's team event. Mattias won two medals at the 2016 European Table Tennis Championships. Paired with Matilda Ekholm he won a silver medal in mixed doubles, and paired with Kristian Karlsson he won a bronze medal in men's doubles. He won the Swedish National team championship with Halmstad BTK 2018 same years as he was a part of the Swedish National team who won a bronze medal at WTTC 2018 which was played in Halmstad Arena (the same arena where Halmstad BTK won gold a month later).

In April 2019, he won a silver medal in the men's singles competition during the World Championships in Budapest, Hungary, after losing the final to Ma Long from China.

Falck's highest world rank was 7th, attained in August 2019.

In 2020, Falck upset Xu Xin at the WTT Macau event in ITTF's restart campaign following the coronavirus pandemic.

2021
In March, Falck was upset by Dimitrij Ovtcharov in the quarter-finals of the WTT Contender event at WTT Doha. He was upset in the round of 32 by An Jaehyun in the WTT Star Contender event.

In June, Falck reached the semi-finals of the European Table Tennis Championships, where he was upset in the semi-finals by eventual champion Timo Boll.

Falck had a disappointing Olympics, losing in the round of 16 in the singles event to Omar Assar. In the team event, Sweden defeated USA in the first round 3–1, but Falck was upset Kanak Jha. Sweden lost to Japan in the quarter-finals after Koki Niwa upset Falck in the fourth round. Niwa later stated that Falck's forehand was not in good condition.

Falck and Kristian Karlsson became World champions in the men's doubles at the 2021 World Table Tennis Championships becoming the first Swedish duo to win gold since 1991.

Playing style
Falck plays with short pips on his forehand. He has stated that his style benefited from the switch to the plastic ball and that he was surprised that more men with pips have not emerged since the ball switch.

References

External links

1991 births
Living people
Swedish male table tennis players
Olympic table tennis players of Sweden
Table tennis players at the 2016 Summer Olympics
People from Karlskrona
Table tennis players at the 2019 European Games
European Games medalists in table tennis
European Games silver medalists for Sweden
Table tennis players at the 2020 Summer Olympics
World Table Tennis Championships medalists
Sportspeople from Blekinge County
20th-century Swedish people
21st-century Swedish people